Suzette or Susette is a given name. Short forms include Suse, Suze, and Zet. Notable people with the name include:

Suzette Charles (born 1963), American singer, entertainer, and actress
Suzette Couture, cofounder with Pierre Sarrazin of Sarrazin Couture Entertainment in Canada
Suzette Defoye (1741–1787), French ballet dancer, stage actor, opera singer and theatre director
 Suzette Doctolero (born 1968), Filipino screenwriter
Suzette Haden Elgin (1936–2015), American science fiction author
Susette La Flesche (1854–1903), Native American writer, lecturer, interpreter and artist of the Omaha tribe in Nebraska
Lilian Suzette Gibbs (1870–1925), British botanist who worked for the British Museum in London
Fay Suzette Godwin (1931–2005), British photographer known for her black-and-white landscapes
Keylin Suzette Gómez (born 1989), Miss Universo Honduras 2011
Susette Borkenstein Gontard, (1769–1802), inspiration for German poet Friedrich Hölderlin's novel Hyperion
Suzette Gresham, American chef
Suzette Forgues Halasz (1918–2004), Canadian cellist and music educator
Suzette Holten (1863–1937), Danish painter and ceramist in the Skovgaard family of artists
Suzette Jordan (1974–2015), women's-rights activist and anti-rape campaigner from Kolkata, India
Suzette Kimball, American geologist, environmental scientist, director of the United States Geological Survey
Suzette Labrousse (1747–1821), French medium, known for her prophecies during the French Revolution
Suzette Lee (born 1975), Jamaican triple jumper
Suzette M. Malveaux (born 1966), Professor of Law at the Columbus School of Law, Catholic University of America
Suzette Mayr, Canadian poet and novelist
Suzette Raines, American politician and a Republican member of the West Virginia House of Delegates
Suzette Ranillo, started at the age of 12 as an actress
Suzette Quintanilla, sister of late singer Selena Quintanilla-Perez
Mari Susette Sandoz (1896–1966), Nebraska novelist, biographer, lecturer, and teacher
Dine Suzette (born 1991), Seychellois football player

See also
Suzette (commune), commune in the Provence-Alpes-Côte d'Azur region in southeastern France
"Suzette" (song), a 1992 single by Dany Brillant
Cape Suzette, fictional city in TaleSpin, half-hour Disney animated adventure series
Crêpe Suzette, French dessert consisting of a crêpe with beurre Suzette
La Semaine de Suzette, French magazine which appeared from 1905 until 1960, aimed at girls
Suse (disambiguation)
Suze (disambiguation)

Suzette Millar 2906 Philippines